Darius Demetrius Slay Jr. (born January 1, 1991) is an American football cornerback for the Philadelphia Eagles of the National Football League (NFL). He played college football at Mississippi State and was drafted by the Detroit Lions in the second round of the 2013 NFL Draft.

Early years
A native of Brunswick, Georgia, Slay attended Brunswick High School, where he was a running back and defensive back. He was named All-State by The Atlanta Journal-Constitution at defensive back following his senior season, and was also chosen for the Georgia North-South All-Star Game. He rushed for over 1,300 yards and 15 touchdowns in the 2008 season, and intercepted six passes with two touchdown returns. His junior season was shortened by a torn medial collateral ligament after he had rushed for 336 yards and six touchdowns in five games. As a sophomore, he put up 1,127 yards on 142 rushes with 13 touchdowns. Slay also lettered in basketball and was a standout track and field athlete. He was timed at 10.9 seconds in the 100 meters and 22 seconds in the 200 meters.

College career
Slay attended Itawamba Community College before transferring to Mississippi State University.

As a freshman at ICC, Slay earned First-team Mississippi Association of Community and Junior Colleges (MACJC) All-State and National Junior College Athletic Association (NJCAA) All-Region 23 honors after record 41 tackles, 3 tackles for loss, 1 sack and forced two fumbles after only playing five games for Coach Jon Williams and the Indians. After his freshman season, he earned JC Gridwire Preseason Second-team All-American honors. During his final season in Fulton, Slay played in all nine games, recorded 32 total tackles, 1 tackle for loss, one forced fumble and one fumble recovery, and had three catches for 63 yards and a touchdown. He earned MACJC First-team All-State honors on defense and special teams.

After ICC, he played for head coach Dan Mullen's Mississippi State Bulldogs football team in 2011 and 2012. In his two seasons for Mississippi State, he had 64 tackles, six interceptions, and two touchdowns.

Professional career
Coming out of Mississippi State, Slay was projected to be a second- or third-round draft pick by the majority of NFL draft experts and scouts. He received an invitation to the NFL combine and completed all of the required combine and positional drills. On March 6, 2013, Slay participated at Mississippi State's pro day in front of team representatives and scouts from 30 NFL teams. He was ranked as the seventh-best cornerback prospect available in the draft by NFL analyst Mike Mayock and was ranked the eighth-best cornerback by NFLDraftScout.com.

Detroit Lions

2013
The Detroit Lions selected Slay in the second round (36th overall) of the 2013 NFL Draft. Slay was the fifth cornerback drafted in 2013, behind Dee Milliner, D. J. Hayden, Desmond Trufant, and Xavier Rhodes.

On May 3, 2013, Slay underwent arthroscopic surgery to repair a torn meniscus in his right knee. On May 13, 2013, the Detroit Lions signed Slay to a four-year, $5.28 million contract that included $3.12 million guaranteed and a signing bonus of $2.22 million.

Head coach Jim Schwartz named Slay the starting cornerback to begin his rookie season.

He earned his first start in his professional regular season debut during the 2013 season opener against the Minnesota Vikings and recorded four solo tackles and a pass deflection as the Lions won 34–24. After giving up a big play, he was benched in favor for veteran Rashean Mathis in the fourth quarter. Slay started the following week, but after struggling he was demoted in favor of Mathis and only appeared on special teams during the Lions' Week 3 victory over the Washington Redskins. On September 29, 2013, Slay had a season-high seven combined tackles and a defense pass in a 40–32 victory over the Chicago Bears. On December 7, 2013, it was confirmed that Slay had suffered a torn meniscus during practice. The injury happened during a non-contact drill and was described as a "freak" accident by head coach Jim Schwartz. It caused him to miss the following three games (Weeks 14–16). On December 31, 2013, the Detroit Lions fired head coach Jim Schwartz after they failed to qualify for the playoffs and finished with a 7–9 record in 2013. Slay finished with 34 combined tackles (27 solo) and six passes defended in four starts and 13 games.

2014
Slay entered training camp slated as a starting cornerback, along with Rashean Mathis, but saw minor competition from Chris Houston. Head coach Jim Caldwell named Slay and Rashean Mathis the starting cornerbacks to begin the regular season in 2014.

Slay started the season-opener against the New York Giants and recorded three solo tackles and a season-high three pass deflections in a 35–14 victory. On September 28, 2014, Slay recorded five combined tackles, deflected a pass, and made his first career interception during a 24–17 victory at the New York Jets in Week 4. Slay made his first career interception off a pass by quarterback Geno Smith, that was originally intended for wide receiver Eric Decker, and returned it for a 40-yard gain in the fourth quarter. In Week 13, he collected a season-high eight combined tackles and had a season-high three pass deflections in the Lions' 34–17 win against the Chicago Bears. On December 14, 2014, Slay recorded five combined tackles, deflected two passes, and made an interception during the Lions' 16–14 win against the Minnesota Vikings in Week 15. Slay intercepted a pass by Vikings' quarterback Teddy Bridgewater, that was intended for wide receiver Greg Jennings, in the second quarter. He started in all 16 games in 2014 and recorded a career-high 61 combined tackles (48 solo), 17 pass deflections, and two interceptions.

The Detroit Lions finished second in the NFC North with an 11–5 record and qualified for a playoff berth. On January 4, 2015, Slay started his first career playoff game and made one solo tackle and broke up a pass as the Lions lost the NFC Wildcard Game 24–20 at the Dallas Cowboys.

2015
Slay entered training camp slated as a starting cornerback. Defensive coordinator Teryl Austin retained Slay and Rashean Mathis as the starting cornerback duo to start the 2015 season.

He started in the Detroit Lions' season-opener at the San Diego Chargers and recorded five solo tackles, a pass deflection, and intercepted a pass by quarterback Philip Rivers during a 28–33 loss. On December 13, 2015, he recorded two solo tackles, deflected a pass, and intercepted St. Louis Rams' quarterback Case Keenum during a 14–21 loss. The next week, he collected a season-high seven combined tackles and two pass deflections, as the Lions defeated the New Orleans Saints 35–27. He started all 16 games in 2015 and recorded 59 combined tackles (48 solo), 13 pass deflections, and two interceptions.

2016
On July 29, 2016, the Detroit Lions signed Slay to a four-year, $48.15 million contract extension with $23.1 million guaranteed and a signing bonus of $14.5 million.

Slay entered training camp as the No. 1 cornerback on the Lions depth chart after the Lions opted to not re-sign Rashean Mathis. Head coach Jim Caldwell named Slay and Nevin Lawson the starting cornerbacks in 2016, along with nickelback Quandre Diggs.

On October 2, 2016, Slay recorded four solo tackles, a season-high three pass deflections, and made his first career sack during the Lions' 17–14 loss at the Chicago Bears in Week 4. Slay sacked quarterback Brian Hoyer for a seven-yard loss in the first quarter. In Week 7, Slay recorded two combined tackles before exiting the Lions' 20–17 victory against the Washington Redskins in the third quarter due to a hamstring injury. His hamstring injury caused him to miss the next two games (Weeks 8–9). In Week 15, he made one tackle before sustained a hamstring injury and exiting in the first half of the Lions' 17–6 loss at the New York Giants. He remained inactive during the Lions' Week 16 loss at the Dallas Cowboys. On January 1, 2017, he collected a season-high eight solo tackles in a 31–24 loss to the Green Bay Packers in Week 17. He finished the 2016 season with 44 combined tackles (43 solo), 13 passes defensed, two interceptions, a sack, and a forced fumble in 13 games and 13 starts.

The Detroit Lions finished second in the NFC North with a 9–7 record and earned a wildcard berth. On January 7, 2017, Slay recorded two combined tackles in the Lions' 26–6 loss at the Seattle Seahawks in the NFC Wildcard Game.

2017
Head coach Jim Caldwell retained Slay and Nevin Lawson as the starting cornerbacks in 2017. On September 18, 2017, Slay recorded a season-high eight combined tackles and two pass deflections during a 24–10 win against the New York Giants. 
In Week 3, he made five solo tackles, defended two passes, and intercepted two passes by quarterback Matt Ryan during a 30–26 loss to the Atlanta Falcons. He returned one 37 yards as the Lions were defeated by the Falcons 26–30. It was the first game of his career with multiple interceptions in the same game. On December 16, 2017, Slay made five combined tackles, three pass deflections, and intercepted two passes by quarterback Mitchell Trubisky in the Lions' 20–10 win over the Chicago Bears. His performance earned him NFC Defensive Player of the Week honors. His two interceptions gave him the lead for most interceptions, with seven, while his 27 passes defended also led the league. Slay became the first Lions player with seven interceptions in a season since Glover Quin in 2014, and the first Lions cornerback to do so since Bruce McNorton in 1983. Since 2000, Slay is the only player in the NFL to accumulate five tackles, two interceptions and three pass defenses twice in the same season. On December 20, 2017, it was announced that Slay was selected to play in the 2018 Pro Bowl, marking the first Pro Bowl selection of his career. He started in all 16 games in 2017 and recorded 60 combined tackles (54 solo), a career-high 26 pass deflections, and eight interceptions. His eight interceptions led the league in 2017. Slay was named First-team All-Pro for the 2017 season. Pro Football Focus gave Slay an overall grade of 80.6, which ranked 16th among all qualifying cornerbacks in 2017. He was also ranked 49th by his peers on the NFL Top 100 Players of 2018.

2018

In Week 14, Slay returned an interception off of quarterback Josh Rosen 67 yards for a touchdown in a 17–3 win over the Arizona Cardinals, earning him NFC Defensive Player of the Week. During the season, he was named to his 2nd Pro Bowl.

2019
In week 2 against the Los Angeles Chargers, Slay recorded his first interception of the season off Philip Rivers in the 13–10 win. Slay was named to his third Pro Bowl in 2019. After the season ended, Slay admitted that he had lost respect for head coach Matt Patricia in the wake of a one-on-one meeting where Patricia told Slay he was not "an elite corner."

Philadelphia Eagles

2020
On March 20, 2020, Slay was traded to the Philadelphia Eagles in exchange for a third-round and fifth-round selection in the 2020 NFL Draft. Along with the trade, Slay signed a new three-year deal the next day with the Eagles worth $50 million including $30 million guaranteed. Slay announced he would be wearing jersey number 24 in honor of Kobe Bryant, as Rodney McLeod already wears #23.

In Week 16 against the Dallas Cowboys, Slay recorded his first interception as an Eagle off a pass thrown by Andy Dalton during the 37–17 loss.

2021

On May 1, 2021, Slay has pursued the opportunity for another number change from 24 to 2 per the new NFL jersey rules.

In week 5 against the Panthers, Slay recorded two interceptions off of Sam Darnold in the 21–18 win. During Slay's week 8 homecoming game against the Detroit Lions, he recovered a fumble by D'Andre Swift and returned it for a 33-yard touchdown in the 44–6 win. On November 17, Slay was named NFC Defensive Player of the Week after a Week 10 performance against the Denver Broncos where he recovered a fumble and returned the ball 82 yards for a touchdown in the Eagles' 30–13 win. The following week, Slay had an interception returned for a touchdown against the New Orleans Saints from quarterback Trevor Siemian in the 40–29 victory. Slay's 116 fumble return yards during the season was the 6th most in a single season in NFL history, and his 3 defensive touchdowns in a single season was the 2nd most in franchise history behind Eric Allen. He was selected to his 4th career Pro Bowl; his first as an Eagle.

2022
In Week 2, Slay had five passes defensed and two interceptions in a 24-7 win over the Minnesota Vikings, earning NFC Defensive Player of the Week. Slay reached his first career Super Bowl when the Eagles defeated the San Francisco 49ers in the NFC Championship Game. In the Super Bowl, Slay recorded 4 tackles but the Eagles lost 38-35 to the Kansas City Chiefs. On March 15, 2023, Slay was released by the Eagles, but would be resigned on an extension the next day on March 16.

2023
On March 16, 2023, Slay agreed to restructure the final year of his contract and signed a two-year extension.

NFL career statistics

Regular season

Postseason

Personal life
Slay is second cousins with former Lions teammate Tracy Walker. Slay is also distantly related to Ahmaud Arbery, who was murdered in February 2020.

References

External links
Philadelphia Eagles bio
Mississippi State Bulldogs bio

1991 births
Living people
American football cornerbacks
Detroit Lions players
Itawamba Indians football players
Mississippi State Bulldogs football players
National Conference Pro Bowl players
People from Brunswick, Georgia
Philadelphia Eagles players
Players of American football from Georgia (U.S. state)